Malendok  Island is an island of the Tanga Islands of Papua New Guinea, located to the east of New Ireland. It is located to the south-west of Boang Island and north-east of Lif Island and Tefa Island. Most inhabitants live in small hamlets on the coast. On the south-western side is a coconut plantation.

References

Islands of Papua New Guinea